Michelle Zink is an American author. She is known for her gothic fantasy series, Prophecy of the Sisters and A Temptation of Angels. Prophecy of the Sisters was named both to Booklist's Top 10 First Novels for Youth and the Autumn 2009 Indie Next List. Other works may be found under the name of Michelle St. James.

Published works 
Prophecy of the Sisters trilogy
 (2009). Prophecy of the Sisters, Little, Brown Books for Young Readers, 352 pages. 
 (2010). Guardian of the Gate, Little, Brown Books for Young Readers, 352 pages. 
 (2011). Circle of Fire, Little, Brown Books for Young Readers, 362 pages. 

A Temptation of Angels
 (2012). A Temptation of Angels, Dial Books for Young Readers, 435 pages. 

This Wicked Game
 (2013). This Wicked Game, Dial Books for Young Readers, 388 pages. 

Lies I Told
 (2015). Lies I Told, HarperTeen, 355 pages. 

Promises I Made
(2015).Promises I Made, HarperTeen, 304 pages. 

A Walk in the Sun
(2016).A Walk in the Sun, HarperTeen, 336 pages. 

Once Upon a Time: Henry and Violet
(2018).Once Upon a Time, Kingswell Teen, 368 pages.

Reviews
"Marketed for young adults, this gothic horror-romance will appeal to aficionados of all ages. The intricate plot twists are matched by Zink's control of her characters' complex personalities as, with uncommon skill for a first time novelist, she builds up to a terrific climax and cleverly lays the groundwork for more books to follow. A fresh and engaging cast of characters, a page-turning plot and lyrical prose add up to an accomplished feat of storytelling." The Guardian on Michelle Zinks' Prophecy of the Sisters.
"The author's language, formal and restrained, is appropriate for the setting and gives the chilly scenes between the sisters an especially gothic air (“We are not the kind of sisters who engage in nightly hair brushing or confided secrets”). While Zink relies on the well-used trope of the grand prophecy, the story is anything but clichéd, with flawed and fragmentary translations, misinterpretation and methodical but inspired deduction complicating and enriching the tale. The result is a captivating tragedy immersed in a world of spells, Samhain and twisting family allegiances that stands on its own while leaving room for sequels." Publishers Weekly on Michelle Zinks' Prophecy of the Sisters.
"She narrates her tale in a late-Victorian voice, describing the enigmatic adults who help her and who have their own roles in the Prophecy. From dangerous séances with deadly consequences to coldblooded sibling murder, this tale is extremely dark, but Zink’s methodical unfolding of events will draw readers in. The ending primes for an anticipated sequel." Kirkus Reviews on Michelle Zinks' Prophecy of the Sisters.
"With this foray into secret voodoo societies and forbidden spells, Zink delivers an enjoyable, fast-paced ride perfect for lovers of the paranormal thriller.The plot is suspenseful, the characters are sympathetic if not fully rounded, and the fictional subculture comes alive through detailed descriptions of the New Orleans setting, particularly the Garden District.Fans of the paranormal, sure to be spellbound by this tale of revenge and teen rebellion, will hope Zink conjures up a sequel." Kirkus Reviews on Michelle Zinks' This Wicked Game.

References

External links 
 
 https://www.goodreads.com/author/show/7520492.Michelle_St_James

21st-century American novelists
American women novelists
Living people
21st-century American women writers
Year of birth missing (living people)